Chiusi (Etruscan: Clevsin; Umbrian: Camars; Ancient Greek: Klysion, Κλύσιον; Latin: Clusium) is a town and comune in the province of Siena, Tuscany, Italy.

History

Clusium (Clevsin in Etruscan) was one of the more powerful cities in the Etruscan League. Chiusi came under the influence of Rome in the 3rd century BC and was involved in the Social War.

In 540 AD it was occupied by the Ostrogoths and was later seat of a Lombard duchy. From the 11th century it was under the rule of the local bishop, and was later contended for by Orvieto and, from 1231, Siena, belonging to the latter until 1556, when it was annexed to the Grand duchy of Tuscany.

The region was devastated by malaria in the Middle Ages, and did not recover until the Valdichiana was drained in the 18th century.

Main sights

The lowlands around Chiusi house numerous trove of tombs for this civilization. The Etruscan Museum of Chiusi is one of the most important repositories of Etruscan remains in Italy.

Other sights include:
The Romanesque Cathedral (Duomo) of San Secondiano, built around 560 AD over a pre-existing basilica, and renovated in the 13th century. It has a nave and two aisles supported by antique columns made from marble taken from ancient buildings. The Sacrament Chapel houses a Nativity and Saints by Bernardino Fugai. It has a separated bell tower which was turned into a defence tower in 1585. Under the tower is a Roman cistern dating from the 1st century BC.
The so-called "Labyrinth of Porsenna", a series of tunnels under the town, built in the 6th-5th century BC and probably utilized in Etruscan-Roman times for drainage of rain waters. According to Pliny the Elder (Naturalis historia, XXXVI, XIX, 91-93), the Labyrinth was part of a monument including the sepulchre of the King Porsenna.
National Archaeological Museum of Chiusi

Transportation
Chiusi is served by an interchange of the Autostrada A1. It is also served by Chiusi-Chianciano Terme station on the Florence–Rome railway, which connects Chiusi to major cities in Italy.

Twin towns
 Andrézieux-Bouthéon, France
 Neu Isenburg, Germany

See also
Lars Porsena
Tomb of Lars Porsena
Roman Catholic Diocese of Chiusi-Pienza
Lago di Chiusi

References

External links

Comune della Città di Chiusi, Official website